HMS Cyclops (F31) was a submarine repair and depot ship of the Royal Navy. She was originally the passenger liner Indrabarah sister ship to Indralema, built by Laing, for the Indra Line Ltd then bought by The Admiralty, while she was building. She was launched on 27 October 1905.

Career
Cyclops served during the First World War as a repair ship with the Grand Fleet where she served the entire conflict based at Scapa Flow. She was paid off on 1 April 1919, then was recommissioned for White Sea duty at Archangel. She returned to Chatham in October 1919 and on 31 January 1920 went into reserve for refit and conversion to a submarine depot ship, commissioning for the 1st Submarine Flotilla, Atlantic Fleet, on 21 December 1922 at Chatham Dockyard.

Between the wars HMS Cyclops served in Malta and was in reserve at the start of the Second World War before returning to Home Waters in late 1939 as the depot ship for the Royal Navy's 7th Submarine Flotilla based in Rothesay.

Between November 1939 and May 1940 Cyclops was the depot ship for the 3rd Submarine Flotilla, based at Parkeston Quay, Harwich Harbour. Her six S-class submarines reconnoitred and raided in the Heligoland Bight and off Denmark. She was nicknamed "Cycle Box". In December 1939 she used her 4-inch guns to engage a German seaplane attacking the harbour.

She was commanded by Cdr. Benjamin Bryant DSO, DSC, RN, from 30 October 1944 to 4 February 1945.

Facilities
Cyclops was equipped with a distillation plant for fresh water, machinery, carpenters' and blacksmiths' shops, coppersmiths', iron and brass foundries.

Fate
Cyclops was sold to John Cashmore Ltd and scrapped at Newport in July 1947.

See also 
 Submarine depot ships

References

Publications

 
 
 

 J P Foynes "The  Battle of the East Coast 1939-1945" and "Who was to Blame for the Loss of HMS Gipsy".
 G W G Simpson "Periscope View".

External links

 Nautical History and Art - Adventures of the Blackgang 
 Naval Historical Collectors & Research Association NHCRA - The Story of one of the Navy's Repair & Depot Ships
 HMS Cyclops at battleships-cruisers.co.uk
 The role played by HMS Cyclops and her flotilla of submarines Isle of Bute during World War II

1905 ships
Fleet auxiliaries of the United Kingdom
World War I naval ships of the United Kingdom
Auxiliary ships of the Royal Navy
World War II auxiliary ships of the United Kingdom
Ships built on the River Wear
Passenger ships of the United Kingdom
Royal Navy Submarine Depot Ships